Tim Mayotte was the defending champion, but did not participate this year.

Simon Youl won the tournament, beating Scott Davis in the final, 2–6, 6–4, 6–4.

Seeds

  Dan Goldie (semifinals)
  Richard Matuszewski (first round)
  Ramesh Krishnan (quarterfinals)
  Scott Davis (final)
  John Frawley (first round)
  Martin Laurendeau (second round)
  Jeff Tarango (quarterfinals)
  Glenn Michibata (semifinals)

Draw

Finals

Top half

Bottom half

External links
 Main draw

OTB Open
1989 Grand Prix (tennis)